Fariha or Fareeha (Arabic: فَرِيحَة, farīḥah) is an Arabic and Urdu female given name meaning "happy". The name is a variant of Farih (فَرِح fariḥ), itself a variant of the name Farah.

Notable persons with that name include:

 Fareeha Fatima (born 1971), Pakistani politician
 Fareeha Mehmood (born 1994), Pakistani cricketer

Fictional characters
 Fareeha Amari, a character in the video game Overwatch

See also
 Farah

References